Silent Tongue is a 1994 American Western horror film written and directed by Sam Shepard. It was filmed in the spring of 1992, but not released until 1994. It was filmed near Roswell, New Mexico and features Richard Harris, Sheila Tousey, Alan Bates, Dermot Mulroney and River Phoenix.

Plot

The film is about a young man named Talbot Roe (Phoenix), who has gone insane over the death of his wife. Talbot's father, Prescott Roe (Harris) feels his son's pain and wants to find him a new wife. He goes back to the place where he bought Talbot's first wife, from Eamon McCree (Bates). He finds the dead wife's sister (Arredondo), who is a champion horse rider and Mr. McCree's daughter, which makes her only half-Indian.

Roe asks McCree if he could have his last daughter for his son, but McCree refuses. Then, Roe kidnaps her and tries to get her to help him, and she takes the deal for gold and four horses. But Talbot is not taking any chances for her. He is too afraid that she will try to take his wife's corpse from him. And for the last few nights, he sees the ghost of his dead wife. She wants him to destroy her corpse, but he refuses.

Cast

Delay in release
The film was the last to be released featuring a performance by River Phoenix, who died on October 31, 1993, from a drug overdose. The film's release was delayed, and Phoenix continued to work on The Thing Called Love (the film he had just completed at the time of his death), which was released before Silent Tongue.

Reception
Peter Travers from Rolling Stone awarded the film 4/4 stars, calling it "a demanding chunk of Shepard frontier poetry that shuns pretty-boy posturing".
Film critics Siskel & Ebert both disliked the film and included it on their Worst of 1994 show; Ebert in particular claimed that "I've seen whole movies that seemed quicker than the last half hour of Silent Tongue" and ridiculed its plot.

See also
 List of ghost films

References

External links
 
 
  
 

1994 films
1994 independent films
1990s Western (genre) horror films
1990s ghost films
American Western (genre) horror films
American independent films
American supernatural horror films
British independent films
Dutch independent films
English-language Dutch films
English-language French films
Films shot in New Mexico
French independent films
Trimark Pictures films
1990s American films
1990s British films
1990s French films